Perdigão may refer to:

 Perdigão, Minas Gerais, a municipality in the state of Minas Gerais in the Southeast region of Brazil
 Perdigão S.A., a Brazilian foods company
 Perdigão (footballer, born 1977), born Cleilton Eduardo Vicente, Brazilian football defensive midfielder
 Perdigão (footballer, born 1991), born Jeferson Fernandes Macedo, Brazilian football winger